Charles Edwin "Dutch" Lieber (February 1, 1910 – December 31, 1961) was a professional baseball player.  He was a right-handed pitcher over parts of two seasons (1935–36) with the Philadelphia Athletics.  For his career, he compiled a 1-2 record, with a 4.01 earned run average, and 15 strikeouts in 58.1 innings pitched.

He was born in Alameda, California and died in Sawtelle, California at the age of 51.

External links

References

1910 births
1961 deaths
Philadelphia Athletics players
Major League Baseball pitchers
Baseball players from California
Mission Reds players
Albany Senators players
Los Angeles Angels (minor league) players
Birmingham Barons players
Portland Beavers players
Sportspeople from Alameda, California